On 30 June or 2 July 2014, the Armed Forces of the Democratic Republic of the Congo and United Nations  forces launched an offensive against rebel groups in the Masisi and Walikale territories, part of the North Kivu province, in the eastern Democratic Republic of the Congo (DRC).

Offensive 
The operation was launched simultaneously from Walikale and Kashebere towards Kibua. By 3 July armed forces have already liberated  Mungazi, Kibati and Ishunga in Luberi territory. On 10 July army reported that Kibua and Bunyampuli have been recaptured. On 28 July MONUSCO spokesman claimed that army controlled Hihama and Utunda areas and mining area of Angoa. On 4 August militiamen returned to the region following withdrawal of armed forces. On 8 August armed forces again launched offensive clashing with NDC in Angowa and Kabombo. On 9 August armed forces captured Angowa on  Walikale-Kisangani road. On 10 August armed forces recaptured Kabombo. NDC militiamen have withdrawn north of Osso river towards Lubero territory. Operation resulted in liberation of the Kashebere-Mpofi-Walikale axis including former stronghold of Buniyampuli and the Kibua-Pinga axis. 23 Mai-Mai Sheka fighters surrendered.

References

North Kivu offensive
North Kivu offensive
Kivu conflict